Charles William Young (10 October 1918 – 22 March 1969) was an Australian rules footballer who played with Fitzroy in the Victorian Football League (VFL).

Family
He married Lucy Carmel Thomas in 1943.

Military service
He enlisted in the Second AIF on 13 May 1943.

Death
He died instantly from injuries he sustained in a massive explosion on the seismic survey ship Western Spruce at Port Welshpool on 22 March 1969.

Notes

References 
 
 World War Two Nominal Roll: Lance Corporal Charles William Young (VX125676/V27504), Department of Veterans' Affairs.
 B883, VX61457: World War Two Service Record: Lance Corporal Charles William Young (VX125676), National Archives of Australia.

External links 

1918 births
Australian rules footballers from Victoria (Australia)
Fitzroy Football Club players
1969 deaths
Accidental deaths in Victoria (Australia)
Australian Army personnel of World War II
Australian Army soldiers